Captain The Honourable Norman de l'Aigle Grosvenor (22 April 1845 – 21 November 1898), was a British Liberal Party politician.

Early life
Grosvenor was one of five sons and two daughters born to Robert Grosvenor, 1st Baron Ebury and the former Hon. Charlotte Wellesley. Robert Grosvenor, 2nd Baron Ebury, was his elder brother. Another brother, Thomas Grosvenor, married Sophia Williams (daughter of the American missionary Samuel Wells Williams).

His father was the third son of Robert Grosvenor, 1st Marquess of Westminster and the former Lady Eleanora Egerton (a daughter of Earl of Wilton). A member of the Grosvenor family headed by the Duke of Westminster, his uncle was Richard Grosvenor, 2nd Marquess of Westminster, while Hugh Grosvenor, 1st Duke of Westminster, and Richard Grosvenor, 1st Baron Stalbridge, were his first cousins. His mother was the eldest daughter of eldest daughter of Henry Wellesley, 1st Baron Cowley.

Career
He was returned to parliament at an unopposed by-election in December 1869 as a Member of Parliament (MP) for Chester, succeeding his cousin Earl Grosvenor, who had succeeded to the peerage. He did not stand again at the 1874 general election.

Personal life
Grosvenor married Caroline Susan Theodora, daughter of James Stuart-Wortley, in 1881. Her father was the Solicitor General under Lord Palmerston and Caroline, herself, was a novelist and artist who led the Women's Farm and Garden Union. They were the parents of two daughters:

 Susan Charlotte Grosvenor (1882–1977), who married John Buchan, 1st Baron Tweedsmuir.
 Margaret Sophie Katherine Grosvenor (1886–), who married Jeremy Peyton-Jones, son of Peyton Peyton-Jones.

Grosvenor died, aged 53, on 21 November 1898. His wife died in August 1940.

Descendants
Through his daughter Susan, he was the grandfather of Alice Buchan, John Buchan, 2nd Baron Tweedsmuir, William Buchan, 3rd Baron Tweedsmuir, and Alastair Francis Buchan, two of whom would spend most of their lives in Canada.

References

External links 

1845 births
1898 deaths
Younger sons of barons
Norman
Liberal Party (UK) MPs for English constituencies
UK MPs 1868–1874